Rotundivalva is a genus of moth in the family Gelechiidae. It contains the species Rotundivalva blanda, which is found in South Africa.

References

Gelechiinae